Ziggy Pig and Silly Seal are fictional, talking animal comic-book characters created by cartoonist Al Jaffee for Marvel Comics' 1940s predecessor, Timely Comics, during the period fans and historians call the Golden Age of Comic Books.

Initially appearing as individual stars of solo features in the comedy anthology Krazy Komics #1 (cover dated July 1942), they were soon teamed to become, along with Super Rabbit, the most prominent stars of what Timely called its "animation" comics. With such Krazy Komics cohorts as Toughy Cat, the anthropomorphic duo are among the first talking-animal characters created specifically for the fledgling medium of comic books, rather than adapted from film, comic strips, or other media. Some stories used the logo Silly Seal and Ziggy Pig, and at least one used simply Silly and Ziggy.

Publication history
Ziggy Pig and Silly Seal were created by cartoonist Al Jaffee for Timely Comics, a predecessor of Marvel Comics, in the comedy anthology comic book Krazy Komics #1 (cover dated July 1942). 
Jaffee recalled in a 2004 interview,

Aside from Jaffee, artists associated with the feature include Joe Calcagno, Harvey Eisenberg, Al Fago Al Genet, and Mike Sekowsky.

Following their individual debuts, Ziggy Pig and Silly Seal were teamed and became stars of Timely Comics' children's-comedy line. They first appeared together on a cover with Krazy Komics #5 (Jan. 1943), and continued as the cover feature through #24 (Sept. 1946), generally with their regular antagonist, Toughy Cat; they also appeared on the ensemble cover of the final issue, #26 (Fall 1946).

Ziggy and Silly became the cover stars of all eight issues of Animated Funny Comic-Tunes (#16-23, Summer 1944 - Fall 1946; Silly not on cover of #18), all seven issues of Silly Tunes (Fall 1945 - April 1947; as part of ensemble on last issue), on issues of Ideal Comics, and elsewhere. They appear on the Super Rabbit-dominated ensemble covers on all but issues #10 & 12 of the dozen-issue All Surprise Comics (Fall 1943 - Winter 1946), and in both the ensemble covers and their own covers on all six issues of Comic Capers (Fall 1944 - Fall 1946). Ziggy and Silly headlined their own six-issue Ziggy Pig-Silly Seal Comics (Jan. 1944 - Sept. 1946).

Silly Tunes #7 (April 1947) marked their final Golden Age appearance. After this era, they reappeared in the one-shot 3-D comic book, Animal Fun 3-D (Dec. 1953), from Premier Magazines. Ziggy and Silly also appeared in issues of the unauthorized reprint titles Billy And Buggy Bear, Wacky Duck, Super Rabbit, and Ziggy Pig from Israel Waldman's I. W. Publications / Super Comics, for a short time beginning in 1958.

Ziggy and Silly appear, along with other Timely animals, in a 2009 issue of Marvel Adventures: Fantastic Four titled "A Timely Family Appearance". Previously Ziggy had appeared in a non-canonical Marvel novelty humor comic Marvel Fumetti Book #1 (April 1984), alongside artist Terry Austin in the two-page story "Inker-Dinker-Doo" by writer Mike Carlin, photographer Vince Colletta, and penciller-inker Austin.

In 2018, Ziggy (via a photo) and Silly appear in Deadpool (2018) #8 in a story where Silly hires Deadpool.

In 2019, Marvel released a Ziggy Pig–Silly Seal one-shot. In this issue, it's revealed that Deadpool was actually hired by Willy Seal, Silly's lookalike cousin.

On August 19, 2022 Marvel released “Ziggy Pig and Silly Seal Infinity Comic” 8 issue series exclusively on the Marvel Unlimited app. The series follows the events from the 2019 Ziggy Pig and Silly Seal One-Shot.

Fictional character biographies
Ziggy Pig and Silly Seal are a type of traditional comedy duo, the straight man and the stooge. Ziggy, who wears a blue hat and a black and yellow sweater with a red "Z", is the slightly smarter of the two, with Silly, a white seal with a toboggan cap and a scarf, the bumbling but occasionally triumphant sidekick whose "help" results in humorous complications. The two often find themselves united on comic book covers against antagonist Toughy Cat.

In other media
The movie Bill & Ted's Excellent Adventure features a scene in an ice cream parlor in which French emperor Napoleon, snatched through time, is challenged to eat a massive ice cream concoction called a "Ziggy Pig". The crowd eggs him on with the chant, "Eat the Pig! /  Eat the Pig! / Ziggy, Ziggy, Ziggy Zig!" After he does so, Napoleon receives a badge depicting the Timely Comics character.

Ziggy Pig is unrelated to the title character of the children's book Ziggy Piggy and the Three Little Pigs, by Frank Asch (Kids Can Press, Ltd., 2001), and to the piggy Ziggy in the children's book A Pig Tale by Olivia Newton-John, Brian Seth Hurst, and Sal Murdocca (Simon & Schuster  Children's Publishing, 1993).

References

External links

Ziggy Pig and Silly Seal at the Grand Comics Database
Ziggy Pig and Silly Seal at Don Markstein's Toonopedia. Archived at Don Markstein's Toonopedia. Archived from the original on November 25, 2009

Timely Comics characters
Golden Age comics titles
Fictional pigs
Fictional pinnipeds
Anthropomorphic animal characters
Comic strip duos
1942 comics debuts
1947 comics endings
Comics characters introduced in 1942
Humor comics
Fantasy comics
Fictional duos
Marvel Comics male characters
Male characters in comics
Comics about animals